Högaborgs BK is a Swedish football club from Helsingborg that was founded in 1927. They currently play in the Swedish fourth division (Division 2).

Background
The club was founded in the spring 1927 by Sven Damberg and Lars Flodin and a group of friends. During their first year they played in blue shirts and white shorts, but in 1928 they changed to their current colours. The newly formed club also laid out a sports ground at Viskans vall in eastern Högaborg but were forced to move out in 1937 because Helsingborg municipality wanted to use the site for housing. The club played at Tre Torns plan in Jönköpingsgatan until 1942 when Harlyckans Idrottsplats was completed and the club moved there. Harlyckan has been the club's home ever since. In 1971 the club was expanded with a ladies section and in 1979 started a floorball section.

Since their foundation in 1927 Högaborgs BK has participated mainly in the middle and lower divisions of the Swedish football league system.  The club currently plays in Division 2 Västra Götaland which is the fourth tier of Swedish football. They play their home matches at the Harlyckans IP in Helsingborg.

Högaborgs BK are affiliated to the Skånes Fotbollförbund.

Season to season

Attendances

In recent seasons Högaborgs BK have had the following average attendances:

Notable alumni

 Mats Magnusson
 Henrik Larsson
 Martin Olsson
 Marcus Olsson
 Jesper Jansson
 Imad Khalili
 Abdul Khalili
Stendy Appeltoft

Footnotes

External links
 Högaborgs BK – Official Website
  Högaborgs BK Facebook
 

Football clubs in Skåne County
Football in Helsingborg
Association football clubs established in 1927
1927 establishments in Sweden